New Scotland Yard is a police drama series produced by London Weekend Television (LWT) for the ITV network between 1972 and 1974. It features the activities of two officers from the Criminal Investigations Department (CID) in the Metropolitan Police force headquarters at New Scotland Yard, as they dealt with the assorted villains of the day.

The first three series ran from 1972 to 1973 and starred John Woodvine as Det. Chief Supt. John Kingdom and John Carlisle as Det. Inspector, later Det. Sgt., Alan Ward. But the series, scheduled on a Saturday night, failed to match the ratings of its more glamorous midweek sister programme, Special Branch.

The programme was resurrected for a fourth series in 1974, with an all-new cast headed by Michael Turner as Det. Chief Supt. Clay and Clive Francis as Det. Sgt. Dexter.

LWT were considered to have broken the rules of Saturday night broadcasting by showing a tough police drama in place of entertainment, but it was an inspiration for The Sweeney. Dennis Waterman, who went on to play a lead role in The Sweeney, appeared in a 1973 episode of New Scotland Yard called 'My Boy Robby?'.

The earlier unrelated Scotland Yard film series (1953–61) was made by Anglo-Amalgamated and was first aired on television by the American Broadcasting Company.

Main cast members
 John Woodvine as Chief Supt. John Kingdom (series 1–3)
 John Carlisle as Det. Inspector, later Det. Sgt., Alan Ward (series 1–3)
 Michael Turner as Chief Supt. Clay (series 4)
 Clive Francis as Det. Sgt. Dexter (series 4)

Critical reception
Reviewing the DVD release of series 1,myReviewer.com noted "a fairly hard-hitting police drama even by today's standards"; and DVD compare.net called it " a fascinating issue-led series that is consistently good."

Episodes

Series 1 (1972)

Series 2 (1972–1973)

Series 3 (1973)

Series 4 (1974)

References

External links
 

1970s British drama television series
1972 British television series debuts
1974 British television series endings
1970s British crime television series
Television shows set in London
Detective television series